Åknes may refer to:

Åknes, Agder, a village in Åseral municipality in Agder county, Norway
Åknes, Nordland, a village in Andøy municipality in Nordland county, Norway
Åknes, Trøndelag, a village in Åfjord municipality in Trøndelag county, Norway